Tatarsky Maloyaz (Tatar Malayaźı) is a rural locality (a selo) and the administrative centre of Maloyazovsky Selsoviet, Salavatsky District, Bashkortostan, Russia. The population was 586 as of 2010. There are 10 streets.

Geography 
Tatarsky Maloyaz is located 4 km north of Maloyaz (the district's administrative centre) by road. Maloyaz is the nearest rural locality.

References 

Rural localities in Salavatsky District